Many  and cenotaphs are located outside of Japan for Japanese people who have died in war or other historical events. This article lists tombs and burial places.

History 
The oldest known Japantown featuring a Japanese cemetery is in Ayutthaya, Thailand, which was established between the 14th and 18th centuries. The oldest known Japanese national recorded by name and buried outside Japan is the early explorer Yamada Nagamasa.

Wars, particularly World War II, have accounted for a majority of the Japanese burial sites located outside of Japan. There is a cemetery for the Imperial Japanese Navy in Malta, multiple cites for Japanese prisoners of war in Siberia, and many Pacific War sites, which include Japanese cemeteries, cenotaphs, and remains in the Nanpō Islands, the Philippines, New Guinea, and other Pacific Islands. There have been multiple efforts by veteran organizations and the Japanese government to return remains to living relatives.

Monuments to victims of the United States' internment of citizens of Japanese ancestry are prevalent in the western US.

Location and names of cemeteries, cenotaphs, and tombs

Asia

Afghanistan 
 Jalalabad outskirt, Gamberi park :  Doctor Serve Nakamura Memorial Tower, built in Jan. 2020

Bhutan 
 Paro: Burial place with the pagoda of botanist Keiji Nishioka

Cambodia 
 Phnom Penh: Cenotaph, Haruyuki Takada, police officer. Died in the line of duty while participating in the United Nations Transitional Authority in Cambodia – Phnom Penh
 Siem Reap Province: Tomb, Taizo Ichinose
 Kampong Thom City, Kampong Thom Province: Atsu Elementary and Junior High School and monument A in a garden bearing the name Atsuhito Nakata. It was built by his father with donations from Japanese people and based on the wishes of the local people (instead of the initial idea of using it for food supplies after a flood in 1998).

China 
 Hong Kong: Japanese cemetery area in Hong Kong Cemetery; 465 tombs of Japanese who died in Hong Kong from 1878 to 1945.
 Fangzheng County, Heilongjiang: Sino-Japanese Friendship Forest, originally Fangzheng Japanese Cemetery.
 Tengchong, Yunnan: Mountain pass of Japanese tombs (日本人の墓の峠), referred to as such by elder people in this area; interred those killed in action in the Battle of Mount Song and Battle of Lamèng･Tengchong(Japanese :ja:拉孟・騰越の戦い)(Chinese :zh:騰衝戰役) at Lamèng (拉孟), Longling County, Baoshan, Yunnan and Tengchong (騰越).

India 
 Imphal: Cenotaph for Japanese war casualties in the )
 Worli, Mumbai: Mumbai Japanese cemetery; 3000 Japanese lived in the Mumbai area to procure cotton in the early Shōwa period. Most of the remains and property of the deceased were brought back to Japan, and the remains of only 30 people remain in Mumbai as of 2008.

Indonesia 
 Jakarta - Kalibata Heroes Cemetery: Honors ex-Japanese soldiers of the Pacific War who participated in the Indonesian National Revolution.
 Tabanan Regency: Cemetery park, Honors ex-Japanese soldiers of the Pacific War participated in the Indonesian National Revolution).

Kazakhstan 
 Karaganda: Burial cenotaph in honor of Japanese prisoners of war

Laos 
 Vientiane Province, Nam Ngum Dam: The grave site of several Japanese engineers surveying possible dam locations who died in December 1960 when their boat overturned. The burial site is in close proximity to the dam.

Malaysia 
 Labuan, Borneo, Labuan Peace Park:  for the 12,000 men who died during the war in Borneo and the surrounding ocean area. Constructed by the Japanese government and with the cooperation of government of Malaysia and the government of Sabah in September 1982.
 Kota Kinabalu Japanese cemetery
 Sandakan Japanese cemetery
 Tawau Japanese cemetery
 Kuala Lumpur Japanese cemetery. Cenotaph for the people who died on Japan Airlines Flight 715.
 Johor Bahru Japanese cemetery
 Kuching Japanese cemetery
 Miri Japanese cemetery (in Tun Datu Tuanku Haji Bujang College)
 Penang Japanese cemetery
 Ipoh Japanese cemetery
 Malacca Japanese cemetery
 Kuala Terengganu Japanese cemetery

Mongolia 
To resolve the lack of labor, the Mongolian government requested to transfer Japanese prisoners of war in the Soviet Union in October and December 1945, and approximately 12,318 Japanese prisoners were forced to work, from which more than 1,600 have died. There are 16 Japanese cemeteries including those listed below.
 Altanbulag Selenge Province Japanese cemetery
 Sükhbaatar Japanese cemetery
They were constructed by the Japanese government in October 2001.)
  Japanese cemetery
  burial (12 Japanese)

Myanmar 
 Yangon Japanese cemetery: For Karayuki-san and Pacific War casualties. , memorial to the approximately 190,000 Japanese who died in war and prayed for peace. It was constructed by the Japanese government in March 1981 before being moved and expanded in size by the Myanmar government in March 1998.)

Nepal 
 Mustang District: Toru Kondo contributed to the development of the Mustang District.

North Korea 
Cemetery and burial place of Japanese who lived in the South Korea area before and after World War II. There are 71 cemeteries and burial places in North Korea.
 Suburb of Pyongyang: ; 2,421 people evacuated to Pyongyang after the end of World War II, August 15, 1945, and died in the period of October 1945 to April 1946 due to cold temperature, stagnant and/or illness.
 Hamhung: Cemetery and burial place.

Philippines 
One of the bloodiest battlefields of the Pacific War; there are many cenotaphs.
 Luzon: Approximately 270 cenotaphs in various locations. Kalayaan – , commemorate approximate 500,000 Japanese war dead in Battle of Luzon. Constructed by Japanese government in March 1973.
 Visayas: Approximately 110 cenotaphs in various locations; Japanese casualties of Battle of the Visayas.
 Mindanao: Approximately 20 cenotaphs in various locations; Japanese casualties of Battle of Mindanao.
 Leyte: Cenotaph in Tacloban, Ormoc and various locations. approximately 80,000 Japanese killed in action out of 520,000 casualties in Battle of Leyte. , a peace commemoration statue between Asia, including Philippines, and Japan in the Kanfuraw Hill where Tacloban City hall is. There is  Shrine in Dulag Airfield.
 Guiuan, Eastern Samar, Samar: Cenotaph in Dumpao Beach.

Russia (Asia region) 
 Primorsky Krai: 146 Japanese cemeteries and burial places.
 Norilsk, Krasnoyarsk Krai: Cenotaph of a deceased father and others, constructed by the son under the valuable efforts of a student from Russia to Japan, on 2 October 2015.
 Yuzhno-Sakhalinsk, Sakhalin Oblast: Japanese cemetery, location is midway between downtown and the airport.
 Smirnykh, Sakhalin Oblast:  (Constructed by Japanese government in November 1996.
 Former , Kholmsk, Sakhalin Oblast: Cenotaph constructed at a former Japanese cemetery place, by affiliated Maokacho people interested, in August 1995.
 Nagornaya street, Nakhodka: Japanese cemetery.
 Listvyanka, Irkutsky District, Irkutsk Oblast, Khabarovsk: ; approximately 60,000 remembered in Siberia. It was constructed by the Japanese government in July 1995.
 Irkutsk Oblast: Cenotaph of approximately 40 buried.
 Amur Oblast: Cenotaph of approximately 41 buried.

Singapore 
 Japanese Cemetery Park

South Korea 
 Geumjeong District, Busan Metropolitan City: 
 Port Hamilton: Japanese cemetery removed after the Treaty of San Francisco

Sri Lanka 
 Colombo: Japanese Cemetery area in Kanatte Cemetery -  and  built in 1965 and 1979 respectively

Taiwan 
 Tainan:'s Japanese columbarium. The former Japanese cemetery before was exhumed and displacement took place in 1997. The then tomb of Akashi Motojiro moved to Cemetery in Sanzhi District, Taipei, other remains moved to Houkakuji temple in Taichung.
 Sanzhi District, Taipei: tomb of Akashi Motojiro
 Taipei: Tomb of Mr. Rokushin
 Taipei: , Japanese cremated remains morgue
 Tainan: Tomb of Yoichi Hatta and his wife.
 Kaohsiung: Japanese cemetery in 
 Hualien County: 
 Hualien County: 
 Pingtung County : At Bashi Channel, Imperial Japanese Navy destroyer Kuretake, transport Tamatsu Maru and many other ships attacked then shipwrecking by United States Navy in Pacific War time. Japanese veteran  survived for 12 days and was saved in August 1944. He built Chouonji temple with his own money in 1981 to memorialize compatriots; 60 families of the deceased, Taiwanese, and Japanese attended the ceremony in August 2015.

Tajikistan 
 Dushanbe, Tajikistan office of United Nations Development Programme: Cenotaph of Yutaka Akino, voluntary participant from the Japanese Ministry of Foreign Affairs staff. Killed in duty of United Nations Mission of Observers in Tajikistan.

Thailand 
Ayutthaya Japanese cemetery
 Kanchanaburi: ; Japanese soldiers worked to build Mueang Kanchanaburi District Burma Railway, including prisoners of war of Allies of World War II and workers from Southeast Asia. It was built by Japanese army railway workers in 1944. Epitaph is written in Japanese, English, Malay, Tamil, Chinese and Vietnamese.

Uzbekistan 
There are thirteen Japanese cemeteries in Uzbekistan.
 Andijan
 Angren
 Bekabad
 Bukhara
 Chirchiq
 Fergana
 Kokand
 Tashkent – Tashkent Japanese prisoners of war in Tashkent Yakkasaray citizen cemetery

Vietnam 
Hội An: Hội An Japanese cemetery memorializing 30 years after the Sakoku and the Japanese started foreign trade by the red seal ships. As a result, Japanese residents of Vietnam could not return to Japan and died there.

Africa

Madagascar 
Two cenotaphs of four Japanese Imperial Japanese Navy killed in Battle of Madagascar in Antsiranana, named Diego-Suarez prior to 1975. First cenotaph for two of four Japanese was constructed in 1976 by the Japanese embassy. Second cenotaph of four was constructed by voluntary efforts of war veterans in 1997.

Oceania

Australia 
Broome, Western Australia: Burial of approximately 900 Japanese immigrants in the Meiji period from Taiji, Wakayama. The immigrants were in Broome to dive for pearls.
Cowra: Cemetery of Cowra breakout Japanese.
Darwin, Northern Territory: Cenotaph of I-121-class submarine.
Thursday Island, Queensland: Cemetery of Japanese immigrants from the Meiji period to the end of World War II. Primary occupation was diving for pearls.

Guam 
South Pacific Memorial Park, cenotaph of South Pacific war dead and ossuary built in May 1970.

New Zealand 
Featherston: cenotaph of Featherston prisoners of war camp
Christchurch: cenotaph of those who died in the 2011 Christchurch earthquake

Northern Mariana Islands 
Banzai Cliff, North end of Saipan:  for 43,000 Japanese killed in action and 12,000 citizens killed in the war regardless of nationality including Japanese migrants to the Saipan, Tinian, Guam islands until the end of the war in 1945. It was constructed by the Japanese government with the cooperation of the Northern Mariana Islands government in March 1974.

Papua New Guinea 
Wewak: , It commemorates 130,000 Japanese killed in action and 50,000 residents killed in the war. It was constructed by the Japanese government with the cooperation of Papua New Guinea in September 1980.
Rabaul, New Britain, Bismarck Archipelago: , 200,000 killed in action at the Battle of Rabaul.

Marshall Islands 
Majuro: . It was constructed by the Japanese government with the cooperation of the government of Republic of the Marshall Islands in March 1984.
Wotje island, Wotje Atoll: Stele of Sekisei troop death in duty (lit.) of more than 1,000 prisoner from Yokohama prison, in 1939, constructed Wotje Airport and North Field (Tinian) (formerly

New Caledonia 
Thio: Burial of 230 Japanese immigrants that came for nickel mining since 1892.
 Burial of the crew of Japanese submarine I-17 killed in action

Palau 
Peleliu: , built in March 1985.

Saipan 
Banzai Cliff: , built in March 1974.

Solomon 
Guadalcanal: Solomon Peace Commemorative Park,  built in 1998.

North America

Canada 
Cumberland, British Columbia: Cumberland Japanese cemetery.  Headstones date back to 1901.

Dominican Republic 
Dajabón Province: Cemetery of Japanese settlement in the Dominican Republic.

United States 
Bronx, New York City: Woodlawn Cemetery.
Brooklyn, New York City: Cypress Hills National Cemetery.
Colma, California: Japanese Cemetery. Contains three Kanrin Maru crew members who died during the first Japanese Embassy to the United States, and others.
Honolulu, Hawaii, Kakaako Waterfront Park: cenotaph of victims of the Ehime Maru and USS Greeneville collision.
 Makiki, Honolulu, Hawaii: Makiki Japanese cemetery built in the early 1900s by Japanese immigrants and the first cemetery of the Imperial Japanese Navy.
Manzanar, Owens Valley, Inyo County, California :  Tomb and cenotaph is near to the visitor center. The cenotaph was built on 15 cent donations from each family in the camp in August 1943. It also holds the remains of six unidentified people.
Queens, New York City: Mount Olivet Cemetery.
Wakamatsu Tea and Silk Farm Colony, Placerville, California: Grave of Okei Ito, the first known Japanese woman to be buried on American soil. Died 1871.

South America

Bolivia 
Santa Cruz Department: Japanese cemetery in the Santa Cruz de la Sierra public cemetery.

Brazil 
São PauloÁlvares Machado Japanese cemetery.
Marajó, Pará: Japanese cemetery. Grave robbed in Jangle.
Ibirapuera Park, São Paulo: 

Peru 
Cañete Province, Lima Region: Casa Blanca Japanese cemetery.

Europe

Malta 
Under Anglo-Japanese Alliance, Winston Churchill called for squadron reinforcements of the Imperial Japanese Navy.

Russia (Europe region) 
Moscow: Donskoy Japanese cemetery in Donskoy Monastery. Tomb of Yasunao Yoshioka, Harbin Consul  who died in prison in Moscow in 1950, and others.

United Kingdom 
Wales: Cenotaph of the  that was shipwrecked by U-boat on December 5, 1918. The wooden cenotaph was renewed with stone cenotaph on its 100th anniversary on October 4, 2018.

See also 
 Japan War-Bereaved Families Association
 Foreign cemeteries in Japan
 Chidorigafuchi National Cemetery

References 

Japanese diaspora
Cemeteries by ethnicity